The construction industry of the United Kingdom is one of the major industry sectors in the UK economy, contributing about 6% of UK gross value added in 2019. In 2018, it was, by GVA, the sixth biggest construction sector in the world.

Scale and composition
Before the COVID-19 pandemic, the value of construction new work peaked at £119,087 million in 2019, dropping to £99,651 million in 2020. Of this total, new housing comprised £37,755 million of new work, infrastructure £22,517 million, and private commercial building £24,614 million. Public sector work (housing, infrastructure, other) accounted for 26% by value of new work in 2020.

The construction sector employed around 2.1 million workers (1.4 million employed in just over 342,000 VAT/PAYE-registered businesses, plus 727,000 self-employed) in Great Britain in 2020, with a high proportion of small businesses: just over one million small/medium-sized businesses, mainly self-employed individuals, worked in the sector in 2019, comprising about 18% of all UK businesses. Over a third of construction businesses in 2020 were located in London and south east England. Women comprised 12.5% of the UK construction workforce.

Industry strategy

Productivity in construction remains below the UK average and has changed little in the past 50 years. As a result, the UK government has repeatedly tried to improve the sector's efficiency, publishing (among others) the Latham Report in 1994, the Egan Report in 1998 and the Farmer Review in 2016; in 2013 it launched the Construction 2025 industrial strategy, which has since been updated through the 2018 industrial strategy, the 2019 Construction Sector Deal, the 2020 Construction Playbook, and the 2021 Transforming Infrastructure Performance: Roadmap to 2030.

, the largest construction project in the UK is construction of the High Speed 2 rail line between London and the West Midlands. Prior to completion of construction, Crossrail was Europe's biggest construction project.

The industry was pushed into a period of turmoil following the Brexit vote in June 2016. Fears of post-Brexit EU labour shortages were cited as a key reason for the uncertainty. Further disruption followed during the COVID-19 pandemic from 2020 onwards, and there were inflationary pressures as a consequence of rising fuel prices following the 2022 Russian invasion of Ukraine.

Health and safety
Construction accounted for 39 of the 142 work fatalities reported in 2021-22, with half of deaths over a five-year period attributed to falls from height. Construction's fatal injury rate (1.62 per 100,000 workers) is around four times higher than the all industry rate. Around 1.8% of construction workers reported musculoskeletal disorders - a higher rate than for workers across all industries (1.1%).

References

 
Building